The 1926-27 Swiss Cup was the second season of Switzerland's annual cup competition.  The competition began on 6 September 1926 and ended on 11 April 1927.  Grasshopper Club Zurich defeated FC Young Fellows Zürich 3-1 in the Final.

References

External links 

 

Swiss Cup seasons
1926–27 domestic association football cups
1926 in association football
1927 in association football